Hugh Ross Mackintosh (31 October 1870 – 8 June 1936) was a Scottish theologian, and parish minister who served as Moderator of the General Assembly of the Church of Scotland in 1932.

Life

He was born in Paisley on 31 October 1870, where his father held the Free Church Gaelic charge. He attended the University of Edinburgh, and then New College, Edinburgh to study divinity. He also took sessions at Freiburg, Halle and Marburg, where he became a particular friend of Wilhelm Herrmann.

His major theological work was his major study addressing the Person of Christ. He arrived at a kenotic doctrine of incarnation following his fellow Scot P. T. Forsyth. His other influential work was the 'Christian Experience of Forgiveness' which attempted to creatively restate the Protestant doctrines of justification and atonement. He argued that justification was forgiveness and that the cross was the cost of forgiveness to God. He also taught T. F. Torrance dogmatics – (systematic theology).

He was a Free Church minister at Tayport (1897–1901) and, following the creation of the United Free Church of Scotland in 1900, of BeechgroveChurch in Aberdeen (U.F. Church) (1901–1904), before becoming professor of divinity at New College (1904–1936).

In 1910 he was living at 81 Colinton Road in south-west Edinburgh.

The Church of Scotland and the United Free Church of Scotland united in 1929. Mackintosh was elected Moderator of the General Assembly of the Church of Scotland in 1932.

He died on 8 June 1936 and is buried with his wife, Jessie Air (1877–1951), in Morningside Cemetery, Edinburgh, towards the south-east.

Publications

The Doctrine of the Person of Christ
The Originality of the Christian Message
Immortality and the Future of the Christian Doctrine of Eternal Life
Selections from the Literature of Theism
Types of Modern Theology

See also
List of Moderators of the General Assembly of the Church of Scotland

References

 Nigel M. de S. et al., Dictionary of Scottish Church History and Theology, pp. 693–698. T & T Clark, Edinburgh 1993.

External links
 
 

1870 births
Alumni of the University of Edinburgh
Scottish Calvinist and Reformed theologians
Moderators of the General Assembly of the Church of Scotland
1936 deaths
20th-century Calvinist and Reformed theologians
19th-century Ministers of the Free Church of Scotland
Ministers of the United Free Church of Scotland
20th-century Ministers of the Church of Scotland